Arthur Pic (born October 5, 1991) is a French retired racing driver. He competed in the GP2 Series between 2014 and 2016.

Career

Karting
Like most top-line drivers, Pic began his racing career in karting, contesting the 2005 French Junior Championship whilst also taking a third-place finish at the Bridgestone Cup and runner-up spot in Spain's Champions Cup at El Vendrell. The following season he claimed fourth in the French Championship before turning his attention to single-seater competition.

Formula Renault 2.0 Series (2009-2010)

In 2007, 15-year-old Pic began his move to single-seater racing by running a limited schedule in the Formula Renault 1.6 Belgium series. The following year, he stepped up to new-for-2008 Formul'Academy Euro Series which he won comfortably at the first attempt, taking nine podium finishes from fourteen races.

Next, Pic competed in both the Eurocup Formula Renault 2.0 and Formula Renault 2.0 West European Cup championships for SG Formula. He finished tenth in the ultra-competitive Eurocup series, taking nine points-scoring positions in 14 races, and sixth place in the West European Cup where he managed two podium finishes and ended the campaign as the highest placed rookie driver.

Remaining in the Eurocup for the 2010 season, Pic switched to Tech 1 Racing. and scored seven pole positions, four fastest laps and four race wins on his way to third in the standings.

Formula Renault 3.5 Series (2011-2013)
It was announced on 3 January 2011 that Pic would drive for Tech 1 Racing in the Formula Renault 3.5 Series alongside Kevin Korjus. After a learning year in which he showed flashes of genuine pace and recorded 12 championship points, he switched to the DAMS squad for 2012 to lead the team's first Formula Renault 3.5 campaign. He immediately proved rapid, taking pole position for the opening two races and scoring enough points to remain among the championship contenders at half-distance. He recorded his first race victory in the championship's trip to Russia, emerging from the weekend as the highest scoring driver with a total of 37 points. A difficult end to the year proved to be his undoing and ultimately left him eighth in the final standings.

Pic remained in the championship for a third year in 2013, joining the new Spanish squad AV Formula. Despite struggling in qualifying for the opening round at Monza, he completed a combined 28 overtaking moves during both races to finish sixth and fourth respectively. He then scored the team's first podium finish in only its second weekend of FR3.5 competition, coming home third at Motorland Aragon. He had a total of nine points-paying finishes over the course of the 2013 season to conclude it eighth in the standings.

MRF Challenge (2013)
During the 2013 off-season, Pic competed in the MRF Challenge championship with backing from Renault. He took a commanding victory at the opening race, which ran in support of the Indian Grand Prix, and won again at the following event in Bahrain. In total, he had seven podium finishes over the course of three weekends.

GP2 Series (2014-2016)
In January 2014, it was confirmed that Pic would drive for the Campos Racing team in the following GP2 Series season. He took his first podium and GP2 win in the feature race at the Hungaroring with two more podiums at Monza and Yas Marina. He remained with Campos for the 2015 season, finishing 11th, four places from where he finished in 2014. He switched to the Rapax Team for the 2016 season.

Personal life
Pic is the younger brother of the racing driver Charles Pic, who has competed in Formula One with the Caterham and Marussia teams.

Racing record

Career summary

Complete Formula Renault 3.5 Series results
(key) (Races in bold indicate pole position) (Races in italics indicate fastest lap)

Complete GP2 Series results
(key) (Races in bold indicate pole position) (Races in italics indicate fastest lap)

† Driver did not finish the race, but was classified as he completed over 90% of the race distance.

References

External links

 
 

1991 births
Living people
People from Montélimar
French racing drivers
Belgian Formula Renault 1.6 drivers
French F4 Championship drivers
Formula Renault Eurocup drivers
Formula Renault 2.0 WEC drivers
British Formula Renault 2.0 drivers
MRF Challenge Formula 2000 Championship drivers
World Series Formula V8 3.5 drivers
GP2 Series drivers
European Le Mans Series drivers
Sportspeople from Drôme
Auto Sport Academy drivers
SG Formula drivers
Tech 1 Racing drivers
DAMS drivers
AV Formula drivers
Campos Racing drivers
Rapax Team drivers